The East Vinod Nagar – Mayur Vihar-II metro station is located on the Pink Line of the Delhi Metro.

As part of Phase III of Delhi Metro, East Vinod Nagar – Mayur Vihar-II is the metro station of the Pink Line.

The station

Station layout

Facilities

List of available ATM at Vinod Nagar East metro station are

Exits

Connections

Bus
Delhi Transport Corporation bus routes number 307A, 348, 349, 611A, serves the station from nearby Mayur Vihar Phase 2 bus stop.

See also
List of Delhi Metro stations
Delhi
List of Delhi Metro stations
Transport in Delhi
Delhi Metro Rail Corporation
Delhi Suburban Railway
Delhi Monorail
Sanjay Lake
Mayur Vihar 
Delhi Transport Corporation
East Delhi
New Delhi
National Capital Region (India)
List of rapid transit systems
List of metro systems

References

External links

 Delhi Metro Rail Corporation Ltd. (Official site)
 Delhi Metro Annual Reports
 
 UrbanRail.Net – descriptions of all metro systems in the world, each with a schematic map showing all stations.

Delhi Metro stations
Railway stations in East Delhi district